Bab Zangi (also Romanized as Bāb Zangī) is a village in Hoseynabad-e Goruh Rural District, Rayen District, Kerman County, Kerman Province, Iran. At the 2006 census, its population was 54, in 10 families.

References 

Populated places in Kerman County